The Norfolk hot dog is a hot dog popular in Norfolk, Virginia. It is served with Lynnhaven mustard, onions and meat sauce.

References 

Hot dogs
Norfolk, Virginia
Cuisine of the Southern United States